Hedley John Woodhouse (January 23, 1920 - December 29, 1984) was a Canadian jockey who won the New York state riding championship in 1953. Born in Vancouver, British Columbia, he began his racing career there in 1937 at the Lansdowne Park racetrack as an apprentice with A.C.T. Stock Farm owned by industrialist Austin C. Taylor. Woodhouse's ability would soon see him racing at tracks along the West Coast of the United States and in 1944 he rode Happy Issue to victory in the Grade I Vanity Handicap and Hollywood Gold Cup at Hollywood Park Racetrack in Inglewood, California.

Woodhouse rode the colt Fisherman to a 3rd-place finish in the 1949 Kentucky Derby, the best result of his four tries between then and 1957. He rode in the Preakness Stakes on three occasions, his best finish a 5th in 1951. Racing out of New York tracks in the first part of the 1950s, Hedley Woodhouse won the 1953 New York riding championship with 138 victories, and was runner-up on three occasions.

After finishing 7th in the 1954 Kentucky Derby on "Fisherman", a colt owned by Cornelius Vanderbilt Whitney and trained by Sylvester Veitch, Woodhouse came within a neck of winning the Belmont Stakes. His 2nd-place finish was his best in the third of the American Triple Crown races.

From being based in New York, Hedley Woodhouse would make his way to the Florida racing circuit where remarkably at age 50 he won the 1970 jockey title at Tropical Park in Miami. He retired the following year having won 2,642 races. He was inducted into the British Columbia Sports Hall of Fame in 1979 and the Canadian Horse Racing Hall of Fame in 1980.

Married to Elsie Woodhouse (1919–1998), their son Robert was also a successful jockey, capturing a number of important stakes races on the New York circuit. Hedley and Robert Woodhouse are the only father and son to win the Whitney Handicap.

Hedley Woodhouse died in 1984.

References

1920 births
1984 deaths
American jockeys
Canadian Horse Racing Hall of Fame inductees
Canadian jockeys
Sportspeople from Vancouver
Canadian emigrants to the United States